The Azul mine is a mine in the north of Brazil in Pará. Azul represents one of the largest manganese reserves in Brazil, having estimated reserves of 64.2 million tonnes of manganese ore grading 28% manganese metal.

References 

Manganese mines in Brazil